Louch is a surname. Notable people with the surname include:

 George Louch (1746–1811), English cricket player
 Herb Louch (1875–1936), Australian Australian rules football player
 Sheek Louch (born 1976), American rapper

See also
 Couch (surname)
 Loch (surname)